Shams-i Fakhri was an Iranian lexicographer and philologist, who is best known as the author of the Mi'yar-i Jamali va-miftah-i Bu Ishaki ("The bird-trap offered to Jamal and the key entrusted to Abu Ishak"), dedicated in 1344 to the last Injuid ruler of Fars, Abu Ishaq Inju.

During his youth, Shams-i Fakhri served in the court of the Hazaraspids of Luristan, where he dedicated the poem Mi‘yar-i nusrati to its ruler Nusrat al-Din Ahmad in 1313. He subsequently joined the court of Ghiyas al-Din ibn Rashid al-Din, the Persian vizier of the Mongol Ilkhanate. He later joined the court of the Injuids.

References

Sources 
  
 

14th-century Persian-language writers
Year of death unknown
Year of birth unknown
Ilkhanate-period poets
Injuid-period poets
Poets of the Hazaraspids
14th-century Iranian people